This is a list of the Russian moth species of the superfamilies Geometroidea and Bombycoidea. It also acts as an index to the species articles and forms part of the full List of moths of Russia.

Geometroidea

Uraniidae
Acropteris iphiata (Guenée, 1857)
Dysaethria cretacea (Butler, 1881)
Dysaethria erasaria (Christoph, 1881)
Dysaethria illotata (Christoph, 1881)
Dysaethria moza (Butler, 1878)
Eversmannia exornata (Eversmann, 1837)
Oroplema plagifera (Butler, 1881)

Geometridae
Abraxas fulvobasalis Warren, 1894
Abraxas grossulariata (Linnaeus, 1758)
Abraxas karafutonis Matsumura, 1925
Abraxas latifasciata Warren, 1894
Abraxas niphonibia Wehrli, 1935
Abraxas pantaria (Linnaeus, 1767)
Abraxas sylvata (Scopoli, 1763)
Acasis appensata (Eversmann, 1842)
Acasis viretata (Hübner, [1799])
Acrodontis kotshubjei Sheljuzhko, 1944
Aethalura ignobilis (Butler, 1878)
Aethalura nanaria (Staudinger, 1897)
Aethalura punctulata ([Denis & Schiffermüller], 1775)
Agaraeus parva (Hedemann, 1881)
Agathia carissima Butler, 1878
Agriopis aurantiaria (Hübner, [1799])
Agriopis bajaria ([Denis & Schiffermüller], 1775)
Agriopis declinans (Staudinger, 1879)
Agriopis dira (Butler, 1878)
Agriopis leucophaearia ([Denis & Schiffermüller], 1775)
Agriopis marginaria (Fabricius, [1776])
Alcis castigataria (Bremer, 1864)
Alcis deversata (Staudinger, 1892)
Alcis extinctaria (Eversmann, 1851)
Alcis jubata (Thunberg, 1788)
Alcis medialbifera Inoue, 1972
Alcis picata (Butler, 1881)
Alcis pryeraria (Leech, 1897)
Alcis repandata (Linnaeus, 1758)
Aleucis distinctata (Herrich-Schäffer, [1839])
Alsophila aceraria ([Denis & Schiffermüller], 1775)
Alsophila aescularia ([Denis & Schiffermüller], 1775)
Alsophila bulawski Beljaev, 1996
Alsophila japonensis (Warren, 1894)
Alsophila murinaria Beljaev, 1996
Alsophila vladimiri Viidalepp, 1986
Alsophila zabolne Inoue, 1941
Alsophiloides kurentzovi Viidalepp, 1986
Amorphogynia necessaria (Zeller, 1849)
Amraica superans (Butler, 1878)
Angerona prunaria (Linnaeus, 1758)
Anticlea derivata ([Denis & Schiffermüller], 1775)
Anticollix sparsata (Treitschke, 1828)
Anticypella diffusaria (Leech, 1897)
Aoshakuna lucia (Thierry-Mieg, 1916)
Apeira syringaria (Linnaeus, 1758)
Aplasta ononaria (Fuessly, 1783)
Aplocera annexata (Freyer, 1830)
Aplocera columbata (Metzner, 1845)
Aplocera efformata (Guenée, [1858])
Aplocera numidaria (Herrich-Schäffer, 1852)
Aplocera perelegans (Warren, 1894)
Aplocera plagiata (Linnaeus, 1758)
Aplocera praeformata (Hübner, [1826])
Aplocera roddi Vasilenko, 1995
Aplocera uniformata (Urbahn, 1971)
Apoaspilates tristrigaria (Bremer & Grey, 1853)
Apocheima cinerarius (Erschoff, 1874)
Apocheima hispidaria ([Denis & Schiffermüller], 1775)
Apochima flabellaria (Heeger, 1838)
Apochima juglansiaria (Graeser, 1889)
Apocolotois arnoldiaria (Oberthür, 1912)
Aporhoptrina semiorbiculata (Christoph, 1881)
Aracima muscosa Butler, 1878
Arbognophos amoenaria (Staudinger, 1897)
Archiearis notha (Hübner, [1803])
Archiearis parthenias (Linnaeus, 1761)
Arichanna albomacularia Leech, 1891
Arichanna flavomacularia Leech, 1897
Arichanna melanaria (Ltnnaeus, 1758)
Arichanna tetrica (Butler, 1878)
Artiora evonymaria ([Denis & Schiffermüller], 1775)
Ascotis selenaria ([Denis & Schiffermüller], 1775)
Asovia maeoticaria (Alphéraky, 1876)
Aspilobapta sylvicola Djakonov, 1952
Aspitates acuminaria (Eversmann, 1851)
Aspitates gilvaria ([Denis & Schiffermüller], 1775)
Astegania honesta (Prout, 1908)
Asthena albulata (Hufnagel, 1767)
Asthena amurensis (Staudinger, 1897)
Asthena anseraria (Herrich-Schäffer, 1855)
Asthena corculina Butler, 1878
Asthena nymphaeata (Staudinger, 1897)
Asthena ochrifasciaria Leech, 1897
Asthena ojrotica Vasilenko, 1998
Asthena percandidata (Christoph, 1893)
Asthena sachaliensis (Matsumura, 1925)
Autotrichia heterogynoides (Wehrli, 1927)
Autotrichia karanguica Vasilenko, [2003]
Autotrichia lysimeles (Prout, 1924)
Autotrichia pellucida (Staudinger, 1890)
Baptria hiroobi Inoue, 1954
Baptria tibiale (Esper, 1804)
Biston achyra Wehrli, 1936
Biston betularia (Linnaeus, 1758)
Biston hypoleucos Kusnezov, 1901
Biston regalis (Moore, 1888)
Biston robustum Butler, 1879
Biston strataria (Hufnagel, 1767)
Biston thoracicaria (Oberthür, 1884)
Brabira artemidora (Oberthür, 1884)
Bupalus piniaria (Linnaeus, 1758)
Bupalus vestalis Staudinger, 1897
Cabera exanthemata (Scopoli, 1763)
Cabera griseolimbata (Oberthür, 1879)
Cabera leptographa Wehrli, 1936
Cabera purus (Butler, 1878)
Cabera pusaria (Linnaeus, 1758)
Cabera schaefferi Bremer, 1864
Calcaritis pallida Hedemann, 1881
Calicha nooraria (Bremer, 1864)
Calicha ornataria (Leech, 1891)
Callabraxas fabiolaria (Oberthür, 1884)
Callabraxas ludovicaria (Oberthür, 1880)
Callabraxas whitelyi (Butler, 1878)
Campaea honoraria ([Denis & Schiffermüller], 1775)
Campaea margaritaria (Linnaeus, 1761)
Camptogramma bilineata (Linnaeus, 1758)
Carige duplicaria Walker, [1863]
Carsia lythoxylata (Hübner, [1799])
Carsia sororiata (Hübner, [1813])
Casilda antophillaria (Hübner, [1813])
Cataclysme riguata (Hübner, [1813])
Catarhoe cuculata (Hufnagel, 1767)
Catarhoe putridaria (Herrich-Schäffer, 1852)
Catarhoe rubidata ([Denis & Schiffermüller], 1775)
Catarhoe yokohamae (Butler, 1881)
Cepphis advenaria (Hübner, 1790)
Chariaspilates formosaria (Eversmann, 1837)
Charissa certhiatus (Rebel & Zerny, [1931])
Charissa obscurata ([Denis & Schiffermüller], 1775)
Charissa pallescens (Rjabov, 1964)
Charissa talyshensis (Wehrli, 1936)
Charissa zejae (Wehrli, 1953)
Chelegnophos ravistriolaria (Wehrli, 1922)
Chesias legatella ([Denis & Schiffermüller], 1775)
Chesias rufata (Fabricius, 1775)
Chiasmia aestimaria (Hübner, [1809])
Chiasmia clathrata (Linnaeus, 1758)
Chiasmia pluviata (Fabricius, 1798)
Chiasmia saburraria (Eversmann, 1851)
Chlorissa amphitritaria (Oberthür, 1879)
Chlorissa anadema (Prout, 1930)
Chlorissa cloraria (Hübner, [1813])
Chlorissa inornata (Matsumura, 1925)
Chlorissa obliterata (Walker, [1863])
Chlorissa viridata (Linnaeus, 1758)
Chloroclysta miata (Linnaeus, 1758)
Chloroclysta siterata (Hufnagel, 1767)
Chloroclystis v-ata (Haworth, 1809)
Chrysoctenis filacearia (Herrich-Schäffer, 1847)
Cidaria distinctata Staudinger, 1892
Cidaria fulvata (Forster, 1771)
Cidaria luteata Choi, 1998
Cinglis humifusaria (Eversmann, 1837)
Cleora cinctaria ([Denis & Schiffermüller], 1775)
Cleora insolita (Butler, 1878)
Cleora leucophaea (Butler, 1878)
Cleorodes lichenaria (Hufnagel, 1767)
Cleta jacutica Viidalepp, 1976
Cleta perpusillaria (Eversmann, 1847)
Cnestrognophos annubilata (Christoph, 1885)
Coenocalpe lapidata (Hübner, [1809])
Colostygia aptata (Hübner, [1813])
Colostygia olivata ([Denis & Schiffermüller], 1775)
Colostygia pectinataria (Knoch, 1781)
Colostygia turbata (Hübner, [1799])
Colotois pennaria (Linnaeus, 1761)
Comibaena amoenaria (Oberthür, 1880)
Comibaena bajularia ([Denis & Schiffermüller], 1775)
Comibaena delicator (Warren, 1897)
Comibaena ingrata (Wileman, 1911)
Comibaena tancrei (Graeser, 1890)
Comibaena tenuisaria (Graeser, 1889)
Comostola subtiliaria (Bremer, 1864)
Cosmorhoe ocellata (Linnaeus, 1758)
Costaconvexa caespitaria (Christoph, 1881)
Costaconvexa polygrammata (Borkhausen, 1794)
Crocallis elinguaria (Linnaeus, 1758)
Crocallis inexpectata Warnecke, 1940
Crocallis tusciaria (Borkhausen, 1793)
Crypsicometa incertaria (Leech, 1891)
Cryptochorina amphidasyaria (Oberthür, 1880)
Ctenognophos burmesteri (Graeser, 1889)
Ctenognophos grandinaria (Motschulsky, [1861])
Ctenognophos tetarte Wehrli, 1931
Culpinia diffusa (Walker, 1861)
Cusiala stipitaria (Oberthür, 1880)
Cyclophora albiocellaria (Hilbner, 1789)
Cyclophora albipunctata (Hufnagel, 1767)
Cyclophora annularia (Fabricius, 1775)
Cyclophora linearia (Hübner, [1799])
Cyclophora pendularia (Clerck, 1759)
Cyclophora porata (Linnaeus, 1767)
Cyclophora punctaria (Linnaeus, 1758)
Cyclophora puppillaria (Hübner, [1799])
Cyclophora quercimontaria (Bastelberger, 1897)
Cyclophora suppunctaria (Zeller, 1847)
Cystidia couaggaria Guenée, [1858]
Cystidia stratonice (Stoll, 1782)
Cystidia truncangulata Wehrli, 1934
Deileptenia mandschuriaria (Bremer, 1864)
Deileptenia ribeata (Clerck, 1759)
Descoreba simplex Butler, 1878
Devenilia corearia (Leech, 1891)
Diaprepesilla flavomarginaria (Bremer, 1864)
Dicrognophos sartata (Treitschke, 1827)
Digrammia rippertaria (Duponchel, 1830)
Dithecodes erasa Warren, 1900
Dyschloropsis impararia (Guenée, [1858])
Dyscia conspersaria ([Denis & Schiffermüller], 1775)
Dyscia fagaria (Thunberg, 1784)
Dyscia innocentaria (Christoph, 1885)
Dysgnophos macgufftni Smiles, 1979
Dysgnophos sibiriata (Guenée, [1858])
Dysgnophos subsplendidaria (Wehrli, 1922)
Dysgnophos turfosaria (Wehrli, 1922)
Dysgnophos urmensis (Wehrli, 1953)
Dysstroma cinereata (Moore, 1867)
Dysstroma citrata (Linnaeus, 1761)
Dysstroma infuscata (Tengstrom, 1869)
Dysstroma korbi (Heydemann, 1929)
Dysstroma latefasciata (Staudinger, 1892)
Dysstroma pseudimmanata (Heydemann, 1929)
Dysstroma truncata (Hufnagel, 1767)
Earophila badiata ([Denis & Schiffermüller], 1775)
Earophila kolomietsi Vasilenko, 2003
Echthrocollix minuta (Butler, 1881)
Ecliptopera capitata (Herrich-Schäffer, [1839])
Ecliptopera pryeri (Butler, 1881)
Ecliptopera silaceata ([Denis & Schiffermüller], 1775)
Ecliptopera umbrosaria (Motschulsky, [1861])
Ectephrina semilutata (Lederer, 1853)
Ectropis aigneri Prout, 1930
Ectropis crepuscularia ([Denis & Schiffermüller], 1775)
Ectropis excellens (Butler, 1884)
Ectropis obliqua (Prout, 1915)
Eilicrinia cordiaria (Hübner, 1790)
Eilicrinia nuptaria Bremer, 1864
Eilicrinia subcordaria (Herrich-Schäffer, 1852)
Eilicrinia trinotata (Metzner, 1845)
Eilicrinia unimacularia Pungeler, 1914
Eilicrinia wehrliii Djakonov, 1933
Electrophaes corylata (Thunberg, 1792)
Electrophaes recens Inoue, 1982
Elophos dilucidaria ([Denis & Schiffermüller], 1775)
Elophos dognini (Thierry-Mieg, 1910)
Elophos vittaria (Thunberg, 1788)
Ematurga atomaria (Linnaeus, 1758)
Endropiodes indictinaria (Bremer, 1864)
Ennomos alniaria (Linnaeus, 1758)
Ennomos autumnaria (Werneburg, 1859)
Ennomos effractaria Freyer, 1841
Ennomos erosaria ([Denis & Schiffermüller], 1775)
Ennomos fuscantaria (Haworth, 1809)
Ennomos infidelis (Prout, 1929)
Ennomos nephotropa Prout, 1930
Ennomos quercaria (Hübner, [1813])
Ennomos quercinaria (Hufnagel, 1767)
Entephria amplicosta Inoue, 1955
Entephria beringiana Troubridge, 1997
Entephria caesiata ([Denis & Schiffermüller], 1775)
Entephria calcephila Tikhonov, 1994
Entephria cyanata (Hübner, [1809])
Entephria flavicinctata (Hübner, [1813])
Entephria ignorata (Staudinger, 1892)
Entephria kidluitata (Munroe, 1951)
Entephria kodara Vasilenko, 2002
Entephria muscosaria (Christoph, 1893)
Entephria nobiliaria (Herrich-Schäffer, 1852)
Entephria occata (Piingeler, 1904)
Entephria olgae Vasilenko, 1990
Entephria polata (Duponchel, 1830)
Entephria punctipes (Curtis, 1835)
Entephria ravaria (Lederer, 1853)
Entephria sachaensis Vasilenko, 1988
Entephria tjemurovi Tikhonov, 1994
Entephria transsibirica Vasilenko, 1990
Entephria tzygankovi Wehrli, 1929
Entephria zolotarenkoi Vasilenko, 2003
Epholca arenosa (Butler, 1878)
Epilobophora kostjuki Tikhonov, 1994
Epione emundata Christoph, 1881
Epione exaridaria Graeser, 1890
Epione repandaria (Hufnagel, 1767)
Epione vespertaria (Linnaeus, 1767)
Epirranthis diversata ([Denis & Schiffermüller], 1775)
Epirrhoe alternata (Miiller, 1764)
Epirrhoe galiata ([Denis & Schiffermüller], 1775)
Epirrhoe hastulata (Hübner, 1790)
Epirrhoe molluginata (Hübner, [1813])
Epirrhoe pupillata (Thunberg, 1788)
Epirrhoe rivata (Hilbner, [1813])
Epirrhoe supergressa (Butler, 1878)
Epirrhoe tartuensis Mols, 1965
Epirrhoe tristata (Linnaeus, 1758)
Epirrita autumnata (Borkhausen, 1794)
Epirrita christyi (Allen, 1906)
Epirrita dilutata ([Denis & Schiffermüller], 1775)
Episteira nigrilinearia (Leech, 1897)
Epobeidia tigrata (Guenée, [1858])
Erannis defoliaria (Clerck, 1759)
Erannis golda Djakonov, 1929
Erannis jacobsoni (Djakonov, 1926)
Esakiopteryx volitans (Butler, 1878)
Euchoeca nebulata (ScopoIi, 1763)
Euchristophia cumulata (Christoph, 1881)
Euchrognophos symmicta (Wehrli, 1953)
Eucyclodes difficta (Walker, 1861)
Eulithis achatinellaria (Oberthür, 1880)
Eulithis convergenata (Bremer, 1864)
Eulithis ledereri (Bremer, 1864)
Eulithis mellinata (Fabricius, 1787)
Eulithis populata (Linnaeus, 1758)
Eulithis prunata (Linnaeus, 1758)
Eulithis pyropata (Hübner, [1809])
Eulithis testata (Linnaeus, 1761)
Eumannia oppositaria (Mann, 1864)
Euphyia biangulata (Haworth, 1809)
Euphyia cineraria (Butler, 1878)
Euphyia coangulata (Prout, 1914)
Euphyia frustata (Treitschke, 1828)
Euphyia sintenisi (Staudinger, 1892)
Euphyia unangulata (Haworth, 1809)
Eupithecia abbreviata Stephens, 1831
Eupithecia abietaria (Goeze, 1781)
Eupithecia absinthiata (Clerck, 1759)
Eupithecia actaeata Walderdorff, 1869
Eupithecia addictata Dietze, 1908
Eupithecia albidulata Staudinger, 1892
Eupithecia aliena Vojnits, 1982
Eupithecia alliaria Staudinger, 1870
Eupithecia amasina Bohatsch, 1893
Eupithecia amplexata Christoph, 1881
Eupithecia analoga Djakonov, 1926
Eupithecia arenbergeri Pinker, 1976
Eupithecia assa Mironov, 1989
Eupithecia assimilata Doubleday, 1856
Eupithecia barteli Dietze, 1908
Eupithecia bastelbergeri Dietze, 1910
Eupithecia bella Staudinger, 1897
Eupithecia biornata Christoph, 1867
Eupithecia bohatschi Staudinger, 1897
Eupithecia breviculata (Donzel, 1837)
Eupithecia carpophilata Staudinger, 1897
Eupithecia cauchiata (Duponchel, 1830)
Eupithecia centaureata ([Denis & Schiffermüller], 1775)
Eupithecia clavifera Inoue, 1955
Eupithecia consortaria Leech, 1897
Eupithecia conterminata (Lienig & Zeller, 1846)
Eupithecia corroborata Dietze, 1908
Eupithecia daemionata Dietze, 1904
Eupithecia denotata (Hübner, [1813])
Eupithecia denticulata (Treitschke, 1828)
Eupithecia despectaria Lederer, 1853
Eupithecia detritata Staudinger, 1897
Eupithecia dissertata (Pungeler, 1905)
Eupithecia distinctaria Herrich-Schäffer, 1848
Eupithecia dodoneata Guenée,[1858]
Eupithecia egenaria Herrich-Schäffer, 1848
Eupithecia emanata Dietze, 1908
Eupithecia ericeata (Rambur, 1833)
Eupithecia exiguata (Hübner, [1813])
Eupithecia expallidata Doubleday, 1856
Eupithecia extensaria (Freyer, 1845)
Eupithecia extraversaria Herrich-Schäffer, 1852
Eupithecia fennoscandica Knaben, 1949
Eupithecia fuscicostata Christoph, 1887
Eupithecia gelidata Moschler, 1860
Eupithecia gigantea Staudinger, 1897
Eupithecia graphata (Treitschke, 1828)
Eupithecia gratiosata Herrich-Schäffer, 1861
Eupithecia groenblomi Urbahn, 1969
Eupithecia gueneata Milli&re, 1862
Eupithecia habermani Viidalepp & Mironov, 1988
Eupithecia haworthiata Doubleday, 1856
Eupithecia holti Viidalepp, 1973
Eupithecia homogrammata Dietze, 1908
Eupithecia icterata (De Villers, 1789)
Eupithecia immundata (Lienig & Zeller, 1846)
Eupithecia inculta Vojnits, 1975
Eupithecia indigata (Hübner, [1813])
Eupithecia innotata (Hufnagel, 1767)
Eupithecia insigniata (Hübner, 1790)
Eupithecia insignioides Wehrli, 1923
Eupithecia interpunctaria Inoue, 1979
Eupithecia intricata (Zetterstedt, 1839)
Eupithecia inturbata (Hübner, [1817])
Eupithecia irriguata (Hübner, [1813])
Eupithecia jezonica Matsumura, 1927
Eupithecia kobayashii Inoue, 1958
Eupithecia kurilensis Bryk, 1942
Eupithecia lacteolata Dietze, 1906
Eupithecia lanceata (Hübner, [1825])
Eupithecia laquaearia Herrich-Schäffer, 1848
Eupithecia lariciata (Freyer, 1842)
Eupithecia leptogrammata Staudinger, 1882
Eupithecia linariata ([Denis & Schiffermiiller], 1775)
Eupithecia lvovskyi Mironov, 1988
Eupithecia mandschurica Staudinger, 1897
Eupithecia marginata Staudinger, 1892
Eupithecia memorata Mironov, 1988
Eupithecia millefoliata Rossler, 1866
Eupithecia minusculata (Alphéraky, 1882)
Eupithecia moecha Dietze, 1904
Eupithecia nanata (Hübner, [1813])
Eupithecia neosatyrata Inoue, 1979
Eupithecia nobilitata Staudinger, 1882
Eupithecia ochridata Schiitze & Pinker, 1968
Eupithecia orphnata W.Petersen, 1909
Eupithecia pernotata Guenée, [1858]
Eupithecia persuastrix Mironov, 1990
Eupithecia pfeifferi Wehrli, 1929
Eupithecia pimpinellata (Hübner, [1813])
Eupithecia plumbeolata (Haworth, 1809)
Eupithecia praepupillata Wehrli, 1927
Eupithecia proterva Butler, 1878
Eupithecia pseudassimilata Viidalepp & Mironov, 1988
Eupithecia pseudoicterata Schiitze, 1960
Eupithecia pseudosatyrata Djakonov, 1929
Eupithecia puengeleri Dietze, 1913
Eupithecia pusillata ([Denis & Schiffermüller], 1775)
Eupithecia pygmaeata (Hübner, [1799])
Eupithecia pyreneata Mabille, 1871
Eupithecia recens Dietze, 1904
Eupithecia repentina Vojnits & De Laever, 1978
Eupithecia rubeni Viidalepp, 1976
Eupithecia satyrata (Hübner, [1813])
Eupithecia scalptata Christoph, 1885
Eupithecia schiefereri Bohatsch, 1893
Eupithecia scribai Prout, 1938
Eupithecia selinata Herrich-Schäffer, 1861
Eupithecia semigraphata Bruand, [1851]
Eupithecia serenata Staudinger, 1896
Eupithecia silenata Assmann, 1848
Eupithecia silenicolata Mabille, 1867
Eupithecia simpliciata (Haworth, 1809)
Eupithecia sinuosaria (Eversmann, 1848)
Eupithecia sophia Butler, 1878
Eupithecia spadiceata Zerny, 1933
Eupithecia spadix Inoue, 1955
Eupithecia spissilineata (Metzner, 1846)
Eupithecia subbreviata Staudinger, 1897
Eupithecia subbrunneata Dietze, 1904
Eupithecia subdeverrata Vojnits, 1975
Eupithecia subfenestrata Staudinger, 1892
Eupithecia subfuscata (Haworth, 1809)
Eupithecia suboxydata Staudinger, 1897
Eupithecia subumbrata ([Denis & Schiffermüller], 1775)
Eupithecia subvulgata Vojnits, 1982
Eupithecia succenturiata (Linnaeus, 1758)
Eupithecia sutiliata Christoph, 1876
Eupithecia tabidaria Iuoue, 1955
Eupithecia takao Inoue, 1955
Eupithecia tantillaria Boisduval, 1840
Eupithecia tantilloides Inoue, 1958
Eupithecia tenuiata (Hübner, [1813])
Eupithecia thalictrata (PiiugeIer, 1902)
Eupithecia tribunaria Herrich-Schäffer, 1852
Eupithecia tricornuta Inoue, 1980
Eupithecia tripunctaria Herrich-Schäffer, 1852
Eupithecia trisignaria Herrich-Schäffer, 1848
Eupithecia usbeca Viidalepp, 1992
Eupithecia valerianata (Hübner, [1813])
Eupithecia variostrigata Alphéraky, 1876
Eupithecia vaticina Vojnits, 1982
Eupithecia venosata (Fabricius, 1787)
Eupithecia veratraria Herrich-Schäffer, 1848
Eupithecia virgaureata Doubleday, 1861
Eupithecia vitiosata Mironov, 2001
Eupithecia vulgata (Haworth, 1809)
Eupithecia zibellinata Christoph, 1881
Eustroma aerosa (Butler, 1878)
Eustroma melancholica (Butler, 1878)
Eustroma reticulata ([Denis & Schiffermüller], 1775)
Exangerona prattiaria (Leech, 1891)
Gagitodes parvaria (Leech, 1891)
Gagitodes sagittata (Fabricius, 1787)
Gandaritis agnes (Butler, 1878)
Gandaritis evanescens (Butler, 1881)
Gandaritis fixseni (Bremer, 1864)
Gandaritis placida (Butler, 1878)
Gandaritis pyraliata ([Denis & Schiffermüller], 1775)
Garueus mirandus (Butler, 1881)
Geometra albovenaria Bremer, 1864
Geometra dieckmanni Graeser, 1889
Geometra giaucaria Menetries, 1859
Geometra papilionaria (Linnaeus, 1758)
Geometra sponsaria (Bremer, 1864)
Geometra ussuriensis (Sauber, 1915)
Geometra valida R.Felder & Rogenhofer, 1875
Glaucorhoe unduliferaria (Motschulsky, [1861])
Glossotrophia diffinaria Prout, 1913
Gnophos obfuscata ([Denis & Schiffermüller], 1775)
Gymnoscelis esakii Inoue, 1955
Gymnoscelis rufifasciata (Haworth, 1809)
Gypsochroa renitidata (Hübner, [1817])
Hastina subfalcaria (Christoph, 1881)
Heliomata glarearia ([Denis & Schiffermüller], 1775)
Hemistola chrysoprasaria (Esper, 1795)
Hemistola nemoriata (Staudinger, 1897)
Hemistola tenuilinea (Alphéraky, 1897)
Hemistola zimmermanni (Hedemann, 1879)
Hemithea aestivaria (Hübner, [1799])
Herbulotia agilata (Christoph, 1881)
Heterarmia buettneri (Hedemann, 1881)
Heterarmia charon (Butler, 1878)
Heterarmia dissimilis (Staudinger, 1897)
Heterolocha laminaria (Herrich-Schäffer, 1852)
Heterophleps confusa (Wileman, 1911)
Heterothera kurenzovi Choi, Viidalepp & Vasiurin, 1998
Heterothera postalbida (Wileman, 1911)
Heterothera quadrifulta (Prout, 1938)
Heterothera serraria (Lienig & Zeller, 1846)
Heterothera serrataria (Prout, 1914)
Heterothera taigana (Djakonov, 1926)
Hirasa paupera (Butler, 1881)
Holarctias rufinaria (Staudinger, 1861)
Horisme aemulata (Hübner, [1813])
Horisme aquata (Hübner, [1813])
Horisme calligraphata (Herrich-Schäffer, 1838)
Horisme corticata (Treitschke, 1835)
Horisme falcata (Bang-Haas, 1907)
Horisme incurvaria (Erschoff, 1877)
Horisme lucillata (Guenée, [1858])
Horisme milvaria (Christoph, 1893)
Horisme scotosiata (Guenée, [1858])
Horisme stratata (Wileman, 1911)
Horisme tersata (Denis & Schiffermüller, 1775)
Horisme vitalbata (Denis & Schiffermüller), 1775)
Hydrelia adesma Prout, 1930
Hydrelia bicauliata Prout, 1914
Hydrelia flammeolaria (Hufnagel, 1767)
Hydrelia gracilipennis Inoue, 1982
Hydrelia musculata (Staudinger, 1897)
Hydrelia nisaria (Christoph, 1881)
Hydrelia parvulata (Staudinger, 1897)
Hydrelia shioyana (Matsumura, 1927)
Hydrelia sylvata ([Denis & Schiffermüller], 1775)
Hydrelia tenera (Staudinger, 1897)
Hydria cervinalis (Scopoli, 1763)
Hydria flavipes (Menetries, 1858)
Hydria hedemannaria (Oberthür, 1880)
Hydria inanata (Christoph, 1881)
Hydria incertata (Staudinger, 1882)
Hydria latifasciaria (Leech, 1891)
Hydria neocervinalis (Inoue, 1982)
Hydria undulata (Linnaeus, 1758)
Hydria veternata (Christoph, 1881)
Hydriomena furcata (Thunberg, 1784)
Hydriomena impluviata ([Denis & Schiffermüller], 1775)
Hydriomena ruberata (Freyer, [1831])
Hylaea fasciaria (Linnaeus, 1758)
Hypomecis akiba (Inoue, 1963)
Hypomecis crassestrigata (Christoph, 1881)
Hypomecis kuriligena (Bryk, 1942)
Hypomecis lunifera (Butler, 1878)
Hypomecis phantomaria (Graeser, 1890)
Hypomecis pseudopunctinalis (Wehrli, 1923)
Hypomecis punctinalis (ScopoIi, 1763)
Hypomecis roboraria ([Denis & Schiffermüller], 1775)
Hypoxystis mandli Schawerda, 1924
Hypoxystis pluviaria (Fabricius, 1787)
Hypoxystis pulcheraria (Herz, 1905)
Hysterura declinans (Staudinger, 1897)
Idaea admiranda Hausmann, 2004
Idaea aureolaria ([Denis & Schiffermüller], 1775)
Idaea auricruda (Butler, 1879)
Idaea aversata (Linnaeus, 1758)
Idaea biselata (Hufnagel, 1767)
Idaea camparia (Herrich-Schäffer, 1852)
Idaea consanguinaria (Lederer, 1853)
Idaea degeneraria (Hübner, [1799])
Idaea denudaria (Prout, 1913)
Idaea descitaria (Christoph, 1893)
Idaea deversaria (Herrich-Schäffer, 1847)
Idaea dilutaria (Hübner, [1799])
Idaea dimidiata (Hufnagel, 1767)
Idaea dohlmanni (Hedemann, 1881)
Idaea effusaria (Christoph, 1881)
Idaea elongaria (Rambur, 1833)
Idaea emarginata (Linnaeus, 1758)
Idaea falckii (Hedemann, 1879)
Idaea foedata (Butler, 1879)
Idaea fuscovenosa (Goeze, 1781)
Idaea humiliata (Hufnagel, 1767)
Idaea imbecilla (Inoue, 1955)
Idaea inquinata (Scopoli, 1763)
Idaea invalida (Butler, 1879)
Idaea jakima (Butler, 1878)
Idaea khankaensis Beljaev, 2006
Idaea laevigata (Scopoli, 1763)
Idaea mancipiata (Staudinger, 1871)
Idaea moniliata ([Denis & Schiffermüller], 1775)
Idaea muricata (Hufnagel, 1767)
Idaea nielseni (Hedemann, 1879)
Idaea nitidata (Herrich-Schäffer, 1861)
Idaea nudaria (Christoph, 1881)
Idaea obsoletaria (Rambur, 1833)
Idaea ochrata (Scopoli, 1763)
Idaea ossiculata (Lederer, 1870)
Idaea pallidata ([Denis & Schiffermüller], 1775)
Idaea politaria (Hübner, [1799])
Idaea promiscuaria (Leech, 1897)
Idaea pseudoaversata Vasilenko, 2007
Idaea pseudopromiscuaria Vasilenko, 2000
Idaea remissa (WiIeman, 1911)
Idaea roseomarginaria (Inoue, 1958)
Idaea rubraria (Staudinger, 1901)
Idaea rufaria (Hübner, [1799])
Idaea rusticata ([Denis & Schiffermüller], 1775)
Idaea salutaria (Christoph, 1881)
Idaea seriata (Schrank, 1802)
Idaea sericeata (Hübner, [1813])
Idaea serpentata (Hufnagel, 1767)
Idaea straminata (Borkhausen, 1794)
Idaea subsericeata (Haworth, 1809)
Idaea sylvestraria (Hübner, [1799])
Idaea terpnaria (Prout, 1913)
Idaea trigeminata (Haworth, 1809)
Idiochlora ussuriaria (Bremer, 1864)
Idiotephria amelia (Butler, 1878)
Idiotephria debilitata (Leech, 1891)
Idiotephria evanescens (Staudinger, 1897)
Inurois brunneus Viidalepp, 1986
Inurois fumosa Inoue, [1944]
Inurois membranaria (Christoph, 1881)
Inurois punctigera (Prout, 1915)
Inurois viidaleppi BeIjaev, 1996
Iotaphora admirabilis (Oberthür, 1883)
Isturgia roraria (Fabricius, [1776])
Ithysia pravata (Hübner, [1813])
Jankowskia athleta Oberthür, 1884
Jankowskia bituminaria (Lederer, 1853)
Jankowskia pseudathleta Sato, 1980
Jodis lactearia (Linnaeus, 1758)
Jodis praerupta (Butler, 1878)
Jodis putata (Linnaeus, 1758)
Juxtephria consentaria (Freyer, [1846])
Kemtrognophos ambiguata (Duponchel, 1830)
Kemtrognophos ciscaucasica (Rjabov, 1964)
Kemtrognophos onustaria (Herrich-Schäffer, 1852)
Kemtrognophos remmi Viidalepp, 1988
Laciniodes denigrata Warren, 1896
Lampropteryx albigirata (Kollar, [1844])
Lampropteryx jameza (Butler, 1878)
Lampropteryx korschunovi (Viidalepp, 1976)
Lampropteryx minna (Butler, 1881)
Lampropteryx otregiata (Metcalfe, 1917)
Lampropteryx suffumata ([Denis & Schiffermüller], 1775)
Larentia clavaria (Haworth, 1809)
Larerannis felipjevi Wehrli, 1935
Larerannis orthogrammaria (Wehrli, 1927)
Leptostegna tenerata Christoph, 1881
Leucobrephos middendorfii (Menetries, 1858)
Ligdia adustata ([Denis & Schiffermüller], 1775)
Lignyoptera fumidaria (Hübner, [1825])
Limeria macraria Staudinger, 1892
Lithostege bosporaria (Herrich-Schäffer, 1848)
Lithostege coassata (Hübner, [1825])
Lithostege farinata (Hufnagel, 1767)
Lithostege griseata ([Denis & Schiffermüller], 1775)
Lithostege infuscata (Eversmann, 1837)
Lithostege ochraceata Staudinger, 1897
Lithostege odessaria (Boisduval, 1848)
Lithostege onkhoica Vasilenko & Gordeeva, 2004
Lithostege pallescens Staudinger, 1897
Lobogonodes erectana (Leech, 1897)
Lobophora halterata (Hufnagel, 1767)
Lomaspilis marginata (Linnaeus, 1758)
Lomaspilis opis Butler, 1878
Lomographa bimaculata (Fabricius, 1775)
Lomographa buraetica (Staudinger, 1892)
Lomographa lungtanensis (Wehrli, 1939)
Lomographa nivea (Djakonov, 1936)
Lomographa pulverata (Bang-Haas, 1910)
Lomographa subspersata (Wehrli, 1939)
Lomographa temerata ([Denis & Schiffermüller], 1775)
Luxiaria amasa (Butler, 1878)
Lycia hanoviensis (Heymons, 1891)
Lycia hirtaria (Clerck, 1759)
Lycia lapponaria (Boisduval, 1840)
Lycia pomonaria (Hübner, 1790)
Lycia zonaria ([Denis & Schiffermüller], 1775)
Lythria cruentaria (Hufnagel, 1767)
Lythria purpuraria (Linnaeus, 1758)
Macaria alternata ([Denis & Schiffermüller], 1775)
Macaria artesiaria ([Denis & Schiffermüller], 1775)
Macaria brunneata (Thunberg, 1784)
Macaria carbonaria (Clerck, 1759)
Macaria circumflexaria (Eversmann, 1848)
Macaria continuaria (Eversmann, 1852)
Macaria fuscaria (Leech, 1891)
Macaria halituaria (Guenée, [1858])
Macaria liturata (Clerck, 1759)
Macaria loricaria (Eversmann, 1837)
Macaria notata (Linnaeus, 1758)
Macaria shanghaisaria Walker, 1861
Macaria signaria (Hübner, [1809])
Macaria wauaria (Linnaeus, 1758)
Malacodea regelaria Tengstrom, 1869
Martania fulvida (Butler, 1881)
Martania minimata (Staudinger, 1897)
Martania saxea (Wileman, 1911)
Martania taeniata (Stephens, 1831)
Maxates fuscofrons (Inoue, 1954)
Maxates grandificaria (Graeser, 1890)
Megabiston plumosaria (Leech, 1891)
Megametopon griseolaria (Eversmann, 1848)
Megaspilates mundataria (Stoll, 1782)
Melanthia mandshuricata (Bremer, 1864)
Melanthia procellata ([Denis & Schiffermüller], 1775)
Menophra senilis (Butler, 1878)
Mesastrape fulguraria (Walker, 1860)
Mesoleuca albicillata (Linnaeus, 1758)
Mesotype didymata (Linnaeus, 1758)
Mesotype parallelolineata (Retzius, 1783)
Mesotype verberata (Scopoli, 1763)
Metabraxas clerica Butler, 1881
Metacrocallis vernalis Beljaev, 1997
Meteima mediorufa (Bastelberger, 1911)
Microbiston lanaria (Eversmann, 1852)
Microbiston phaeothorax Wehrli, 1941
Microcalicha sordida (Butler, 1878)
Microloxia herbaria (Hübner, [1813])
Minoa murinata (Scopoli, 1763)
Monocerotesa lutearia (Leech, 1891)
Mujiaoshakua plana (Wileman, 1911)
Napuca albaria (Bartel, 1903)
Napuca curvaria (Eversmann, 1852)
Napuca forbesi (Munroe, 1963)
Napuca kozhantchikovi (Munroe, 1963)
Napuca mongolicus (Vojnits, 1975)
Napuca obscurata (Wehrli, 1953)
Napuca ochrearia (Rossi, 1794)
Napuca orciferaria Walker, [1863]
Napuca staudingeri (Vojnits, 1975)
Napuca taylori (Butler, 1893)
Narraga fasciolaria (Hufnagel, 1767)
Narraga tessularia (Metzner, 1845)
Naxa seriaria (Motschulsky, 1866)
Nebula approximata (Staudinger, 1879)
Nebula egenata (Prout, 1914)
Nebula mongoliata (Staudinger, 1897)
Nebula nebulata (Treitschke, 1828)
Nebula propagata (Christoph, 1893)
Neognopharmia stevenaria (Boisduval, 1840)
Nothocasis bellaria (Leech, 1891)
Nothocasis sertata (Hübner, [1817])
Nothomiza submediostrigata Wehrli, 1939
Nychiodes divergaria Staudinger, 1892
Nyssiodes lefuarius (Erschoff, 1872)
Ochodontia adustaria (Fischer von Waldheim, 1840)
Ochyria quadrifasiata (Clerck, 1759)
Ocoelophora lentiginosaria (Leech, 1891)
Odezia atrata (Linnaeus, 1758)
Odontognophos dumetata (Treitschke, 1827)
Odontognophos zacharia (Staudinger, 1879)
Odontopera aurata (Prout, 1915)
Odontopera bidentata (Clerck, 1759)
Odontorhoe fidonaria (Staudinger, 1892)
Operophtera brumata (Linnaeus, 1758)
Operophtera brunnea Nakajima, 1991
Operophtera elegans Beljaev, 1996
Operophtera fagata (Scharfenberg, 1805)
Operophtera japonaria (Leech, 1891)
Operophtera peninsularis Djakonov, 1931
Operophtera rectipostmediana Inoue, 1942
Operophtera relegata Prout, 1908
Ophthalmitis albosignaria (Bremer & Grey, 1853)
Ophthalmitis irrorataria (Bremer & Grey, 1853)
Opisthograptis luteolata (Linnaeus, 1758)
Orihostixis cribraria (Hübner, [1799])
Orthonama obstipata (Fabricius, 1794)
Orthonama vittata (Borkhausen, 1794)
Ourapteryx falciformis Inoue, 1993
Ourapteryx japonica Inoue, 1993
Ourapteryx koreana Inoue, 1993
Ourapteryx maculicaudaria (Motschulsky, 1866)
Ourapteryx sambucaria (Linnaeus, 1758)
Ourapteryx ussurica Inoue, 1993
Pachycnemia hippocastanaria (Hübner, [1799])
Pachyerannis obliquaria (Motschulsky, [1861])
Parabapta aetheriata (Graeser, 1889)
Parabapta clarissa (Butler, 1878)
Paradarisa consonaria (Hübner, [1799])
Paradysstroma corussaria (Oberthür, 1880)
Paraleptomiza bilinearia (Leech, 1897)
Parectropis nigrosparsa (WiIeman & South, 1917)
Parectropis similaria (Hufnagel, 1767)
Pareulype berberata ([Denis & Schiffermüller], 1775)
Pareulype consanguinea (Butler, 1878)
Pasiphila chloerata (Mabille, 1870)
Pasiphila debiliata (Hübner, [1817])
Pasiphila excisa (Butler, 1878)
Pasiphila obscura (West, 1929)
Pasiphila rectangulata (Linnaeus, 1758)
Pasiphila subcinctata (Prout, 1915)
Pelurga comitata (Linnaeus, 1758)
Pelurga onoi (Inoue, 1965)
Pelurga taczanowskiaria (Oberthür, 1880)
Pennithera comis (Butler, 1879)
Pennithera djakonovi (Kurentzov, 1950)
Perconia strigillaria (Hübner, [1787])
Peribatodes correptaria (Zeller, 1847)
Peribatodes rhomboidaria ([Denis & Schiffermüller], 1775)
Peribatodes secundaria ([Denis & Schiffermüller], 1775)
Perizoma affinitata (Stephens, 1831)
Perizoma albulata ([Denis & Schiffermüller], 1775)
Perizoma alchemillata (Linnaeus, 1758)
Perizoma bifaciata (Haworth, 1809)
Perizoma blandiata ([Denis & Schiffermüller], 1775)
Perizoma contrita (Prout, 1914)
Perizoma flavofasciata (Thunberg, 1792)
Perizoma haasi (Hedemann, 1881)
Perizoma hydrata (Treitschke, 1829)
Perizoma illepida (Inoue, 1955)
Perizoma lugdunaria (Herrich-Schäffer, 1855)
Perizoma minorata (Treitschke, 1828)
Perizoma parahydrata (Alberti, 1969)
Petrophora chlorosata (Scopoli, 1763)
Phaiogramma etruscaria (Zeller, 1849)
Phanerothyris sinearia (Guenée, [1858])
Phaselia serrularia (Eversmann, 1847)
Phibalapteryx virgata (Hufnagel, 1767)
Phigalia djakonovi Moltrecht, 1933
Phigalia pilosaria ([Denis & Schiffermüller], 1775)
Phigalia sinuosaria Leech, 1897
Phigalia verecundaria (Leech, 1897)
Phigalia viridularia Beljaev, 1996
Phigaliohybernia latifasciaria Beljaev, 1996
Philereme corrugata Butler, 1884
Philereme transversata (Hufnagel, 1767)
Philereme vetulata ([Denis & Schiffermüller], 1775)
Photoscotosia atrostrigata (Bremer, 1864)
Photoscotosia palaearctica (Staudinger, 1882)
Phthonandria emaria (Bremer, 1864)
Phthonosema corearia (Leech, 1891)
Phthonosema invenustaria (Leech, 1891)
Phthonosema serratilinearia (Leech, 1897)
Phthonosema tendinosaria (Bremer, 1864)
Phyllometra culminaria (Eversmann, 1843)
Plagodis dolabraria (Linnaeus, 1767)
Plagodis pulveraria (Linnaeus, 1758)
Planociampa antipala Prout, 1930
Plemyria rubiginata ([Denis & Schiffermüller], 1775)
Plerotocera insignilinearia Beljaev, 1994
Plerotocera ussurica Djakonov, 1949
Polythrena coloraria (Herrich-Schäffer, 1855)
Praethera anomala (Inoue, 1954)
Praethera praefecta (Prout, 1914)
Problepsis phoebearia Erschoff, 1870
Problepsis plagiata (Butler, 1881)
Problepsis superans Butler, 1885
Protalcis concinnata (Wileman, 1911)
Proteostrenia leda (Butler, 1878)
Proteostrenia reticulata (Sterneck, 1928)
Proteuchloris neriaria (Herrich-Schäffer, 1852)
Protoboarmia faustinata (Warren, 1897)
Protoboarmia simpliciaria (Leech, 1897)
Protorhoe corollaria (Herrich-Schäffer, 1848)
Protorhoe unicata (Guenée, [1858])
Protothera firmata (Hübner, [1822])
Pseudentephria lamata (Staudinger, 1897)
Pseuderannis lomozemia (Prout, 1930)
Pseudobaptria corydalaria (Graeser, 1889)
Pseudopanthera macularia (Linnaeus, 1758)
Pseudostegania defectata (Christoph, 1881)
Pseudoterpna pruinata (Hufnagel, 1767)
Psilalcis keytiparki Beljaev & Stuning, 2000
Psodos coracina (Esper, 1805)
Psodos sajana Wehrli, 1919
Psychophora cinderella Viidalepp, 2001
Psychophora sabini Kirby, 1824
Psyra boarmiata (Graeser, 1893)
Pterapherapteryx sexalata (Retzius, 1783)
Pterygnophos agnitaria (Staudinger, 1897)
Pterygnophos creperaria (Erschoff, 1877)
Pterygnophos dorkadiaria (Wehrli, 1922)
Pterygnophos ochrofasciata (Staudinger, 1896)
Ptygmatophora staudingeri (Christoph, 1881)
Pungeleria capreolaria ([Denis & Schiffermüller], 1775)
Pygmaena fusca (Thunberg, 1792)
Rheumaptera hastata (Linnaeus, 1758)
Rheumaptera hecate (Butler, 1878)
Rheumaptera subhastata (Nolcken, 1870)
Rhodometra sacraria (Linnaeus, 1767)
Rhodostrophia badiaria (Freyer, 1841)
Rhodostrophia calabra (Petagna, 1786)
Rhodostrophia jacularia (Hübner, [1813])
Rhodostrophia terrestraria (Lederer, 1869)
Rhodostrophia vibicaria (Clerck, 1759)
Rhopalognophos glaucinaria (Hübner, [1799])
Scardamia aurantiacaria Bremer, 1864
Scardamia obliquaria Leech, 1897
Schistostege nubilaria (Hübner, [1799])
Scionomia anomala (Butler, 1881)
Scionomia mendica (Butler, 1879)
Scionomia parasinuosa Inoue, 1982
Scopula aequifasciata (Christoph, 1881)
Scopula agutsaensis Vasilenko, 1997
Scopula albiceraria (Herrich-Schäffer, 1844)
Scopula apicipunctata (Christoph, 1881)
Scopula arenosaria (Staudinger, 1879)
Scopula asthena Inoue, 1943
Scopula astheniata Viidalepp, 2005
Scopula axiata (Pungeler, 1909)
Scopula beckeraria (Lederer, 1853)
Scopula cajanderi (Herz, 1904)
Scopula coniaria (Prout, 1913)
Scopula corrivalaria (Kretschmar, 1862)
Scopula decorata ([Denis & Schiffermüller], 1775)
Scopula dignata (Guenée, [1858])
Scopula disclusaria (Christoph, 1881)
Scopula divisaria (Christoph, 1893)
Scopula eunupta Vasilenko, 1998
Scopula flaccidaria (Zeller, 1852)
Scopula floslactata (Haworth, 1809)
Scopula frigidaria (Moschler, 1860)
Scopula ichinosawana (Matsumura, 1925)
Scopula ignobilis (Warren, 1901)
Scopula imitaria (Hübner, [1799])
Scopula immistaria (Herrich-Schäffer, 1852)
Scopula immorata (Linnaeus, 1758)
Scopula immutata (Linnaeus, 1758)
Scopula impersonata (Walker, 1861)
Scopula incanata (Linnaeus, 1758)
Scopula marginepunctata (Goeze, 1781)
Scopula modicaria (Leech, 1897)
Scopula nemoraria (Hübner, [1799])
Scopula nigropunctata (Hufnagel, 1767)
Scopula nivearia (Leech, 1897)
Scopula nupta (Butler, 1878)
Scopula ochraceata (Staudinger, 1901)
Scopula orientalis (Alphéraky, 1876)
Scopula ornata (Scopoli, 1763)
Scopula permutata (Staudinger, 1897)
Scopula prouti Djakonov, 1935
Scopula pudicaria (Motschulsky, [1861])
Scopula rubiginata (Hufnagel, 1767)
Scopula semignobilis Inoue, 1942
Scopula submutata (Treitschke, 1828)
Scopula subpunctaria (Herrich-Schäffer, 1847)
Scopula subtilata (Christoph, 1867)
Scopula superior (Butler, 1878)
Scopula supernivearia Inoue, 1963
Scopula tenuisocius Inoue, 1942
Scopula ternata Schrank, 1802
Scopula tessellaria (Boisduval, 1840)
Scopula turbulentaria (Staudinger, 1870)
Scopula umbelaria (Hübner, [1813])
Scopula virginalis (Fourcroy, 1785)
Scopula virgulata ([Denis & Schiffermüller], 1775)
Scopula vojnitsi Inoue, 1992
Scotopteryx acutangulata (Inoue, 1941)
Scotopteryx aelptes (Prout, 1937)
Scotopteryx alpherakii (Erschoff, 1877)
Scotopteryx bipunctaria ([Denis & Schiffermüller], 1775)
Scotopteryx burgaria (Eversmann, 1843)
Scotopteryx chenopodiata (Linnaeus, 1758)
Scotopteryx coarctaria ([Denis & Schiffermüller], 1775)
Scotopteryx langi (Christoph, 1885)
Scotopteryx luridata (Hufnagel, 1767)
Scotopteryx moeniata (Scopoli, 1763)
Scotopteryx mucronata (Scopoli, 1763)
Scotopteryx pinnaria (Christoph, 1888)
Scotopteryx subvicinaria (Staudinger, 1892)
Scotopteryx transbaicalica (Djakonov, 1955)
Selenia dentaria (Fabricius, 1775)
Selenia lunularia (Hübner, [1788])
Selenia ononica I.Kostjuk, 1991
Selenia sordidaria Leech, 1897
Selenia tetralunaria (Hufnagel, 1767)
Seleniopsis evanescens (Butler, 1881)
Selidosema brunnearia (De Villers, 1789)
Selidosema plumaria ([Denis & Schiffermüller], 1775)
Sibatania mactata (R. Felder & Rogenhofer, 1875)
Siona lineata (Scopoli, 1763)
Solitanea defricata (Pungeler, 1904)
Somatina indicataria (Walker, 1861)
Spargania luctuata ([Denis & Schiffermüller], 1775)
Spartopteryx kindermannaria (Staudinger, 1871)
Spilopera debilis (Butler, 1878)
Spiralisigna subpumilata (Inoue, 1972)
Stamnodes danilovi Erschoff, 1877
Stamnodes depeculata (Lederer, 1870)
Stamnodes pauperaria (Eversmann, 1848)
Stegania cararia (Hübner, 1790)
Stegania dalmataria (Guenée, [1858])
Stegania dilectaria (Hübner, 1790)
Stegania trimaculata (De Villers, 1789)
Synegia ichinosawana (Matsumura, 1925)
Synopsia sociaria (Hübner, [1799])
Synopsia strictaria (Lederer, 1853)
Taeniophila unio (Oberthür, 1880)
Tephrina arenacearia ([Denis & Schiffermüller], 1775)
Tephrina inconspicuaria (Hübner, [1819])
Tephrina kaszabi Vojnits, 1974
Tephrina murinaria ([Denis & Schiffermüller], 1775)
Tephronia sepiana (Hufnagel, 1767)
Thalera chlorosaria Graeser, 1890
Thalera fimbrialis (Scopoli, 1763)
Thalera lacerataria Graeser, 1889
Thera bellisi Viidalepp, 1977
Thera britannica (Turner, 1925)
Thera cognata (Thunberg, 1792)
Thera juniperata (Linnaeus, 1758)
Thera obeliscata (Hübner, [1787])
Thera variata ([Denis & Schiffermüller], 1775)
Thera vetustata ([Denis & Schiffermüller], 1775)
Therapis flavicaria ([Denis & Schiffermüller], 1775)
Theria crypta Wehrli, 1940
Theria rupicapraria ([Denis & Schiffermüller], 1775)
Thetidia albocostaria (Bremer, 1864)
Thetidia chlorophyllaria (Hedemann, 1879)
Thetidia correspondens (Alphéraky, 1883)
Thetidia smaragdaria (Fabricius, 1787)
Timandra apicirosea (Prout, 1935)
Timandra comae Schmidt, 1931
Timandra comptaria Walker, [1863]
Timandra dichela (Prout, 1935)
Timandra griseata W.Petersen, 1902
Timandra paralias (Prout, 1935)
Timandra recompta (Prout, 1930)
Timandra rectistrigaria (Eversmann, 1851)
Trichobaptria exsecuta (R.Felder & Rogenhofer, 1875)
Trichodezia haberhaueri (Lederer, 1864)
Trichodezia kindermanni (Bremer, 1864)
Trichopteryx carpinata (Borkhausen, 1794)
Trichopteryx exportata (Staudinger, 1897)
Trichopteryx fastuosa Inoue, 1958
Trichopteryx grisearia (Leech, 1891)
Trichopteryx hemana (Butler, 1878)
Trichopteryx incerta Yazaki, 1978
Trichopteryx polycommata ([Denis & Schiffermüller], 1775)
Trichopteryx terranea (Butler, 1878)
Trichopteryx ussurica (Wehrli, 1927)
Trichopteryx ustata (Christoph, 1881)
Triphosa dubitata (Linnaeus, 1758)
Triphosa sabaudiata (Duponchel, 1830 )
Triphosa sericata (Butler, 1879)
Triphosa taochata Lederer, 1870
Triphosa vashti (Butler, 1878)
Tristrophis veneris (Butler, 1878)
Tyloptera bella (Butler, 1878)
Venusia blomeri (Curtis, 1832)
Venusia cambrica Curtis, 1839
Venusia laria Oberthür, 1893
Venusia phasma (Butler, 1879)
Venusia semistrigata (Christoph, 1881)
Wilemania nitobei (Nitobe, 1907)
Xanthorhoe abrasaria (Herrich-Schäffer, [1855])
Xanthorhoe abraxina (Butler, 1879)
Xanthorhoe annotinata (Zetterstedt, 1839)
Xanthorhoe aridela (Prout, 1937)
Xanthorhoe asiatica (Staudinger, 1882)
Xanthorhoe biriviata (Borkhausen, 1794)
Xanthorhoe decoloraria (Esper, [1806])
Xanthorhoe deflorata (Erschoff, 1877)
Xanthorhoe derzhavini (Djakonov, 1931)
Xanthorhoe designata (Hufnagel, 1767)
Xanthorhoe evae Viidalepp & Remm, 1982
Xanthorhoe ferrugata (Clerck, 1759)
Xanthorhoe fluctuata (Linnaeus, 1758)
Xanthorhoe hortensiaria (Graeser, 1890)
Xanthorhoe insperata (Djakonov, 1926)
Xanthorhoe kamtshatica (Djakonov, 1929)
Xanthorhoe majorata Heydemann, 1936
Xanthorhoe montanata ([Denis & Schiffermüller], 1775)
Xanthorhoe muscicapata (Christoph, 1881)
Xanthorhoe okchotinaria Beljaev & Vasilenko, 1998
Xanthorhoe pseudomajorata Vasilenko, 2003
Xanthorhoe rectantemediana (Wehrli, 1927)
Xanthorhoe rectifasciaria (Lederer, 1853)
Xanthorhoe sajanaria (Prout, 1914)
Xanthorhoe spadicearia ([Denis & Schiffermüller], 1775)
Xanthorhoe stupida (Alphéraky, 1897)
Xanthorhoe uralensis Choi, 2003
Xenortholitha propinguata (Kollar, [1844])
Xerodes albonotaria (Bremer, 1864)
Xerodes rufescentaria (Motschulsky, [1861])
Zanclidia testacea (Butler, 1881)
Zola terranea (Butler, 1879)

Bombycoidea

Lasiocampidae
Amurilla subpurpurea (Butler, 1881)
Bhima eximia Oberthür, 1880
Bhima idiota (Graeser, 1888)
Chilena sordida (Erschoff, 1874)
Cosmotriche lobulina ([Denis & Schiffermüller], 1775)
Dendrolimus pini (Linnaeus, 1758)
Dendrolimus spectabilis (Butler, 1877)
Dendrolimus superans (Butler, 1881)
Eriogaster arbusculae Freyer, 1849
Eriogaster henkei (Staudinger, 1879)
Eriogaster lanestris (Linnaeus, 1758)
Eriogaster neogena (Fisher von Waldheim, 1824)
Euthrix albomaculata (Bremer, 1861)
Euthrix laeta (Walker, 1855)
Euthrix potatoria (Linnaeus, 1758)
Gastropacha clathrata Bryk, 1948
Gastropacha orientalis Sheljuzhko, 1943
Gastropacha populifolia (Esper, 1784)
Gastropacha quercifolia (Linnaeus, 1758)
Kunugia undans (Walker, 1855)
Lasiocampa eversmanni (Kindermann, 1843)
Lasiocampa quercus (Linnaeus, 1758)
Lasiocampa trifolii ([Denis & Schiffermüller], 1775)
Macrothylacia rubi (Linnaeus, 1758)
Malacosoma castrense (Linnaeus, 1758)
Malacosoma franconicum ([Denis & Schiffermüller], 1775)
Malacosoma neustrium (Linnaeus, 1758)
Malacosoma squalorum Zolotuhin, 1994
Odonestis pruni (Linnaeus, 1758)
Pachypasa otus (Drury, 1773)
Paralebeda femorata (Menetries, 1858)
Phyllodesma griseum I.Kostjuk & Zolotuhin, 1994
Phyllodesma ilicifolium (Linnaeus, 1758)
Phyllodesma japonicum (Leech, [1889])
Phyllodesma joannisi de Lajonquiere, 1963
Phyllodesma jurii I.Kostjuk, 1992
Phyllodesma tremulifolium (Hübner, [1810])
Poecilocampa aphelia Tschistjakov & Zolotuhin, 1994
Poecilocampa populi (Linnaeus, 1758)
Poecilocampa tamanukii (Matsumura, 1928)
Poecilocampa tenera Bang-Haas, 1927
Somadasys brevivenis (Butler, 1885)
Streblote stupidum (Staudinger, 1887)
Syrastrenopsis moltrechti Grünberg, 1914
Takanea excisa (Wileman, 1910)
Trabala vishnou (Lefebvre, 1827)
Trichiura crataegi (Linnaeus, 1758)

Bombycidae
Bombyx mori (Linnaeus, 1758)
Oberthueria caeca (Oberthür, 1880)
Rondotia menciana Moore, 1885

Endromididae
Endromis versicolora (Linnaeus, 1758)
Mirina christophi (Staudinger, 1887)

Saturniidae
Actias artemis (Bremer & Grey, 1852)
Actias gnoma (Butler, 1877)
Aglia japonica Leach, [1889]
Aglia tau (Linnaeus, 1758)
Antheraea pernyi (Guérin-Méneville, 1861)
Antheraea yamamai (Guérin-Méneville, 1855)
Caligula boisduvalii (Eversmann, 1846)
Caligula japonica Moore, 1862
Eriogyna pyretorum (Westwood, 1847)
Eudia pavonia (Linnaeus, 1758)
Eudia spini ([Denis &, Schiffermüller], 1775)
Neoris huttoni Moore, 1862
Rhodinia fugax (Butler, 1877)
Rhodinia jankowskii (Oberthür, 1880)
Samia cynthia (Drury, [1773])
Saturnia pyri ([Denis & Schiffermüller], 1775)

Lemoniidae
Lemonia taraxaci ([Dennis & Schiffermüller], 1775)
Lemonia dumi (Linnaeus, 1761)
Lemonia ballioni (Christoph, 1888)
Lemonia balcanica (Herrich-Schäffer, 1847)

Brahmaeidae
Brahmaea tancrei Austaut, 1896

Sphingidae
Acherontia atropos (Linnaeus, 1758)
Acherontia lachesis (Fabricius, 1798)
Acosmeryx naga (Moore, [1858])
Agrius convolvuli (Linnaeus, 1758)
Ampelophaga rubiginosa Bremer & Grey, 1853
Callambulyx tatarinovii (Bremer & Grey, 1853)
Cephonodes hylas (Linnaeus, [1771])
Choerocampa askoldensis (Oberthür, 1879)
Choerocampa porcellus (Linnaeus, 1758)
Choerocampa suellus (Staudinger, 1878)
Clanis bilineata (Walker, 1866)
Clanis undulosa Moore, 1879
Daphnis nerii (Linnaeus, 1758)
Deilephila elpenor (Linnaeus, 1758)
Dolbina exacta Staudinger, 1892
Dolbina tancrei Staudinger, 1887
Hemaris affinis (Bremer, 1861)
Hemaris alternata (Butler, 1874)
Hemaris croatica (Esper, [1800])
Hemaris fuciformis (Linnaeus, 1758)
Hemaris radians (Walker, 1856)
Hemaris saldaitisi Eitschberger, Danner & Surholt, 1998
Hemaris staudingeri Leech, 1890
Hemaris tityus (Linnaeus, 1758)
Hippotion celerio (Linnaeus, 1758)
Hyles chuvilini Danner, Eitschberger & Surholt, 1998
Hyles costata (Nordmann, [1851])
Hyles euphorbiae (Linnaeus, 1758)
Hyles gallii (Rottemburg, 1775)
Hyles hippophaes (Esper, [1793])
Hyles livornica (Esper,[1779])
Hyles nicaea (Prunner, 1798)
Hyles vespertilio (Esper, [1780])
Hyles zygophylli (Ochsenheimer, 1808)
Hyloicus morio Rothschild & Jordan, 1903
Hyloicus pinastri (Linnaeus, 1758)
Kentrochrysalis consimilis Rothschild & Jordan, 1903
Kentrochrysalis sieversi Alphéraky, 1897
Kentrochrysalis streckeri (Staudinger, 1880)
Laothoe amurensis (Staudinger, 1892)
Laothoe populeti Bienert, 1870
Laothoe populi (Linnaeus, 1758)
Macroglossum bombylans Boisduval, [1875]
Macroglossum pyrrhosticta Butler, 1875
Macroglossum saga Butler, 1878
Macroglossum stellatarum (Linnaeus, 1758)
Marumba gaschkewitschii (Bremer & Grey, 1853)
Marumba jankowskii (Oberthür, 1880)
Marumba maackii (Bremer, 1861)
Marumba quercus ([Denis & Schiffermüller], 1775)
Marumba sperchius (Menetries, 1857)
Mimas christophi (Staudinger, 1887)
Mimas tiliae (Linnaeus, 1758)
Phyllosphingia dissimilis (Bremer, 1861)
Proserpinus proserpina (Pallas, 1772)
Psilogramma menephron (Cramer, [1780])
Rhagastis mongoliana (Butler, [1876])
Smerinthus caecus Menetries, 1857
Smerinthus ocellatus (Linnaeus, 1758)
Smerinthus planus Walker, 1856
Sphecodina caudata (Bremer & Grey, 1853)
Sphingonaepiopsis gorgoniades (Hübner, [1819])
Sphingonaepiopsis kuldjaensis (Graeser, 1892)
Sphingulus mus Staudinger, 1887
Sphinx ligustri Linnaeus, 1758
Theretra alecto (Linnaeus, 1758)
Theretra japonica (Boisduval, 1869)
Theretra oldenlandiae (Fabricius, 1775)

References 

Moths